The Hans A. Hansen House is a historic house in Ephraim, Utah. It was built in 1862 by Hans A. Hansen, an immigrant from Denmark who converted to the Church of Jesus Christ of Latter-day Saints and arrived in Utah in 1853. Hansen had two wives: Annie, who had emigrated to the United States with him, and Mary Christiansen. He built a second house in the Scandinavian style, but this house was designed in a Vernacular English, or "traditionally American", style, which is interpreted by Tom Carter of the Utah State Historical Society as Hansen's willingness to integrate in American society. The house has been listed on the National Register of Historic Places since October 22, 1980.

References

		
National Register of Historic Places in Sanpete County, Utah
Houses completed in 1862
1862 establishments in Utah Territory